Adrián Ben Montenegro (born 4 August 1998) is a Spanish middle-distance runner specialising in the 800 metres and 1500 metres.

In 2017, he competed in the junior men's race at the 2017 IAAF World Cross Country Championships held in Kampala, Uganda.

International competitions

References

External links
 
 
 
 

1998 births
Living people
Spanish male middle-distance runners
People from Viveiro
Sportspeople from the Province of Lugo
Spanish male cross country runners
Athletes (track and field) at the 2020 Summer Olympics
Olympic athletes of Spain
21st-century Spanish people